Muskowekwan 85-8 is an Indian reserve of the Muskowekwan First Nation in Saskatchewan. It is 6 kilometres northeast of Lestock. In the 2016 Canadian Census, it recorded a population of 5 living in 1 of its 2 total private dwellings.

References

Indian reserves in Saskatchewan
Division No. 10, Saskatchewan